Something Special is the thirteenth studio album by American band Kool & the Gang, released in 1981.  It was the group's third consecutive Platinum-certified album.

Reception

It continued the level of success that the band's previous two albums brought, contained several hit singles including: "Take My Heart" went to No. 1 on the R&B chart and No. 17 on the Pop chart. "Get Down on It" reached No. 4 on the R&B chart and No. 10 on the Pop chart. In addition, "Steppin' Out" ended up at No. 12 on the R&B chart and No. 89 on the Pop chart. In the UK, the album reached #10, becoming their first hit album there and most successful studio album of all, largely due to the success of the "Get Down On It" single.

"Stand Up and Sing" was featured in 1982's The Pirate Movie.

Track listing

Personnel
Bass, backing vocals – Robert "Kool" Bell
Lead guitar – Charles Smith
Saxophone, keyboards, backing vocals – Ronald Bell
Drums, backing vocals – George Brown
Lead and backing vocals – James "J.T." Taylor
Alto saxophone – Dennis Thomas
Alto saxophone, flute, backing vocals – Steve Greenfield
Trombone – Clifford Adams
Trumpet, backing vocals – Michael Ray, Robert Mickens
Keyboards – Brian Jackson
Keyboards – Eumir Deodato
Additional percussion – Jimmy Maelen
Additional handclaps – Platinum Hook
Backing vocals – Clifford Adams, Cynthia Huggins, Joan Motley, Kelly Barretto

Production
Engineer – Jim Bonnefond
Assistant engineers – Bobby Scott Cohen, Cliff Hodson, Joe DeAngelis, Julian Robertson
Overdubs engineers – Bob "Ziggy" Winard, Mallory Earl
Mixed by – Eumir Deodato, Jim Bonnefond, Gabe Vigorito
Mastered by – Tom Coyne, Stephan Galfas (Assistant)
Producer – Eumir Deodato
Associate producer – Kool & The Gang
CD Mastering - Joe Gastwirt

Charts

Certifications

See also
List of number-one R&B albums of 1981 (U.S.)

References

External links

1981 albums
Kool & the Gang albums
De-Lite Records albums
Albums produced by Eumir Deodato